Arlanzón is a municipality and town located in the province of Burgos, Castile and León, Spain.

The municipality of Arlanzón is made up of five settlements: Arlanzón (seat or capital), Agés, Galarde, Santovenia de Oca and Zalduendo.

Demography
According to the 2004 census (INE), the municipality had a population of 411 inhabitants.

Trails
One of the variants of the Camino de Santiago passes through the area.  The Camino is a World Heritage Site ("Routes of Santiago de Compostela: Camino Francés and Routes of Northern Spain").

The Greenway of the Sierra de la Demanda, a former railway line, leads from Arlanzón to Monterrubio de la Demanda.

References

Municipalities in the Province of Burgos